James M. Wallace (1750 – December 17, 1823) was an American politician who served as a Democratic-Republican member of the U.S. House of Representatives for Pennsylvania's 3rd congressional district from 1815 to 1821.

Wallace was born in Hanover Township, Pennsylvania.  He pursued preparatory studies in Philadelphia, and participated in the American Revolutionary War as a member of Capt. James Roger's, Col. Timothy Green's, and Capt. William Brown's companies, and at the close of the war was major of a battalion of Associators.

He commanded a company of rangers in defense of the frontier in 1779. He became major of the Dauphin County Militia in 1796.  He was one of the commissioners of the county from 1799 to 1801, and a member of the Pennsylvania House of Representatives from 1806–10.

Wallace was elected as a Republican to the Fourteenth Congress to fill the vacancy caused by the declination of Amos Slaymaker to serve.  He was reelected to the Fifteenth and Sixteenth Congresses.

He declined to be a candidate for renomination and retired to his farm. He died near Hummelstown, Pennsylvania.  Interment in the Old Derry Church Graveyard, Derry, Pennsylvania.

Links

The Political Graveyard

1750 births
1823 deaths
Politicians from Harrisburg, Pennsylvania
Pennsylvania militiamen in the American Revolution
People of colonial Pennsylvania
Burials in Pennsylvania
Democratic-Republican Party members of the United States House of Representatives from Pennsylvania
Date of birth unknown